A corrido is a traditional style of dance and music of Spain. In some areas of Castilla, this form was known as salteado. This dance was very popular in all Castilla and León in 19th and early 20th century.

This form has an irregular rhythm, typically Castillian. The corrido consists of two parts, the first being of oscillatory and lateral movement in fast pace, and the second is similar to the jota.

References
Garland Encyclopedia of World Music (Book 8). . Routledge; Har/Com edition (November 1999).

External links
Corrido castellano

Spanish music
Spanish dances
Spanish folk music